Shupra Castle is a historical place that located in Ta'if, Saudi Arabia. The castle had created by Al-Shareef Ali Basha in 1905, and it was completed within two years (1907). Then, the castle converted into a museum in 1995. King Abdul Aziz and King Faisal used to use the palace a residence when visiting Ta'if.

The castle 
The castle was built at 1905, it has an Islamic architecture style. It appears in the columns the Islamic architecture, in the doors, windows and decorated ceilings. The castle is surrounded by trees from outside.

The castle consists of four floors, above the cellar, its include 150 rooms. Also, it has many entrances. The castle has four facades. In the main hall, there is a large wooden staircase, the gates of the castle and its windows made by carved wood with an artistic touch. The castle located in one of the largest streets in the city which called Shupra Street, and palace is one of the monuments in Taif.

The museum  
The museum is one of the most important museums in the Kingdom and shows the historical and political stages of the castle. The museum provides an overview of the establishment of the palace and the historical and political periods. Also, it contains a collection of stone works, pottery masterpieces, and inscriptions on both paintings and rocks. Besides, there is a section for crafts and industries such as extracting Taif-roses that yield oil and water. Another section is about the old market that is called (khan) locally. Regarding the museum, it exhibits various antiques and paintings on ancient rocks, hang on wooden shelves. Those antiques were discovered at Taif and its originals trace back into the Pre-Islamic and the Islamic eras. Some of those antiques are: 

 Flagstones inscribed with Islamic calligraphy and its types throughout the ages.
 Different types and sizes of millstones used for grinding grains.
 Ancient weapons like swords, shields, daggers, spears, guns and rifles.
 Ancient precious jewels, jewelries and stamps.
 Ancient gold and silver coins and iron locks
 Household utensils and lamps which are made of stone, pottery and glass.
 An old distillation device for extracting rose water and oil, which is the most famous thing about Taif.
 Ancient agricultural tools and antiques carts for transporting stones and rocks that were used in the construction of the historical Al-Samalqi Dam, which was built at the time of the Umayyad Caliphate by Muawiyah bin Abi Sufyan.

References 

Museums in Saudi Arabia